Alnwick Abbey was founded as a Premonstratensian monastery in 1147 by Eustace fitz John near Alnwick, England, as a daughter house of Newhouse Abbey in Lincolnshire. It was dissolved in 1535, refounded in 1536 and finally suppressed in 1539. The Alnwick Abbey site is located just within Hulne Park,  on the bank of the River Aln. The only visible remnant is the impressive 14th-century gatehouse, a Grade I listed building.

Founding
Eustace fitz John became lord of the barony of Alnwick by his marriage with Beatrix, the daughter of Ivo de Vesci. He endowed it amply.
The charter of foundation, included in a confirmatory charter of Henry Percy, Earl of Northumberland, is addressed to William of St. Barbara, Bishop of Durham. Among the souls for whose benefit it was erected, is mentioned that of Ivo de Vesci.  From Dugdale's authority, it is said that the first of that order came to settle at Alnwick in the year 1147. The order first came over in 1143, and settled at Newhouse, in Lincolnshire, in their monastery built by Peter of Goxhill, dedicated to St. Mary and St. Martial. Although following a rule based on the "Rule of St. Augustine", the Premonstratensian order incorporated Cistercian values of austerity and seclusion and founded all its monasteries in rural locations.

Dependencies included the hospital at Alnwick, and Guyzance Priory, which was annexed to Alnwick by Eustace fitz John.

Fourteenth-century banquet
In the chronicle of this house, preserved in the library of King's College, Cambridge, there is an account of a banquet given by Walter de Hepescotes, the abbot, A. D. 1376, on the day of the Assumption of the Blessed Virgin Mary, to Henry the 4th Lord of Alnwick, with the thirteen following knights, William de Acon, Richard Tempest, Walter Blount, Allan de Heton, John Conyers, John Heron, John Littleburum, Thomas de Ilderton, Thomas de Boynton, Ingram de Umfravil, John de Dichaunt, John de Swynton, Radulphus de Viners, and many others of the chief gentry of the country, amounting to 120, all entertained in the refectory; in addition to eighty-six at a second repast. The cloisters too were filled with commoners of all ages, to the number of 1,020, who were likewise there feasted.

Burials
It appears from the same authority, that a number of the Percys were interred here; particularly Henry, the second Lord of Alnwick, who died c. 1351: Henry the third Lord, who bestowed on the monks £100l at his death, A. D. 1368; also Mary his wife, daughter of Henry, 3rd Earl of Lancaster.

Henry, the fourth Lord of Alnwick, A. D. 1372, was admitted in the month of February to the Brotherhood of this chapter, together with many other knights and esquires; as also, in the succeeding year, Henry his eldest son, with his two brothers, Sir Thomas and Sir Ralph.

Other burials
John de Vesci
Eustace de Vesci
William de Vesci and his wife Burga de Stuteville (daughter of Robert III de Stuteville)
Henry Percy, 1st Earl of Northumberland
Mary of Lancaster

Famine and pestilence
During the abbacy of Walter de Hepescotes, this house was afflicted with a great scarcity, together with a pestilence, whereby all the cattle belonging to the monastery were destroyed.

Representation in parliament
The abbot of this house was summoned to the parliaments of the 23rd, 24th, 28th, 32nd, and 34th years of King Edward I; also to that held at Carlisle, 35th of the same reign; and to the parliament of the 19th King Edward II.

Dissolution and subsequent possession
At the Dissolution of the Monasteries in 1539, the revenues of this house were valued at £1,89l. 15s. by Dugdale, and £1,94l. 7s. by Speed, there being then thirteen canons. King Edward VI in the fourth year of his reign, granted the site to Ralph Sadler and Laurence Winnington. It came afterwards to the possession of the Brandling family and the Doubledays.

Francis Brandling welcomed King James at Alnwick Abbey on 7 May 1617 for two nights. The king had come from Bothal Castle and was on his way to Scotland.

Gatehouse and tower
There are no remains of the Abbey except for the gatehouse and tower, which by the architecture and arms sculptured upon the building, show it is of much more modern date than the foundation of the house. This tower is not square, but oblong, having an exploratory turret on each corner. The north side is ornamented with a niche, canopied, capable of receiving a statue five feet high: most probably it contained the effigies of the dedicatory Virgin. Beneath is a figure of an angel in relief, with expanded wings. Over this entrance are shields of arms, a cross, supposed to be the arms of the Vesci family, and a Cross moline. On the south side, in a niche, is the figure of one of the Religious, of the order of White Friars of Premonstratenses, in his proper habilament, in fairly good preservation. This front is ornamented with shields of arms, the arms of Brabant adopted by the Percys, with the arms of Lucys quarterly, the principal; and also the arms of Vesci.
A gate opens to the east, on each side of which are the figures of cherubs supporting armorial shields: on this front is also a canopy and niche for a statue. Here are the arms of Brabant and the arms of the Lucys on separate shields. At this entrance, as also on the north side, were machicolations; and in the centre of the arching of the gateway is a square aperture, from which the possessors could annoy assailants. The masonry of this tower is excellent; the gates of lattice braced with iron still remain.
Above the gate going into the court of the house is an escutcheon of white marble, much injured by the weather, but retaining some marks of the sculptor, to distinguish that it once contained the crest of the Doubledays, an arm in armour suspending a mullet. The antiquity of this piece has been much doubted, but the materials determine that point clearly.

The gatehouse is Grade I listed as a Scheduled Ancient Monument.

Abbots

Appearance in film
The Gatehouse is featured in the opening scenes of the 1998 film Elizabeth.

See also 
List of monastic houses in Northumberland
List of monastic houses in England

Notes

References

External links 
 
 

Alnwick
Monasteries in Northumberland
Premonstratensian monasteries in England
1147 establishments in England
1539 disestablishments in England
Christian monasteries established in the 12th century